Mirko Hanák (26 June 1921 in Martin — 4 November 1971 in Prague) was a Czech painter, graphic artist, and illustrator who became famous mainly for his distinctive illustrations and lithographs with natural themes. The theme of his drawings and prints were often wild animals coming from the Czech countryside. He first studied visual arts in Zlín after World War II, then at the Academy of Arts in Prague. He was also an illustrator of a series of fictional works with themes of the natural environment, the author or co-author of calendars, posters, and other single-purpose prints. He died age 50 of leukemia.

External links  
 Page in the Folklore Association of the Czech Republic
 The exhibition in the Central Bohemian Gallery

1921 births
1971 deaths
Czech painters
Czech male painters
Czech illustrators
Czechoslovak painters